Operation Vulcan (22 April – 6 May 1943) and Operation Strike (6–12 May 1943) were the final ground attacks by the Allied forces against the Italian and German forces in Tunis, Cape Bon, and Bizerte, the last Axis toeholds in North Africa, during the Tunisia Campaign of the Second World War.

Background
Generalfeldmarschall Erwin Rommel believed that the Axis position in Tunisia was untenable, and he had recommended the evacuation of all German troops to Italy, where he believed they could be more useful. His advice was rejected by Adolf Hitler. In April 1943, a major Allied air force effort (Operation Flax) had cut off Axis supplies to North Africa. U.S. II Corps, commanded by Major General Omar Nelson Bradley, surrounded the last defenders at Enfidaville, ending the Axis effort in North Africa. Operation Retribution and the control of the air and of the sea prevented any large-scale evacuation of Axis troops to Italy. The initial offensive was codenamed Vulcan.

Operations

Vulcan
The fighting was costly against German units in well-prepared and dug-in defences. In the advance on Tunis, the British 4th Infantry Division (British IX Corps, Lieutenant-General Brian Horrocks) was opposed by German paratroops (Fallschirmjager) of the elite Hermann Göring Parachute Division. At Cactus Far, the British infantry was faced by extensive defensive fire from well-concealed German paratroopers. Churchill tanks of the 12th Royal Tank Regiment (21st Tank Brigade), advanced without infantry support and the tanks were assaulted by the defenders using Molotov cocktails and sticky "teller" anti-tank mines. Twelve tanks were destroyed and in some cases, their crews were rescued from the burning wrecks by the Germans.

Strike
On 30 April it was realized that a revision was necessary to achieve success. The revised final phase of the assault on Tunis was codenamed Strike and launched six days later. On that day, the British First Army (Lieutenant-General Kenneth Anderson), took Tunis and American troops reached Bizerte. The German commander, General Hans-Jürgen von Arnim, finally surrendered on 12 May.

Aftermath
On 13 May, all remaining Axis forces in Tunisia, under the command of Marshal Giovanni Messe, surrendered unconditionally. Messe had, with Mussolini's approval, tried to negotiate an "honourable surrender" the previous day, but this had been rejected. Earlier in the morning he was promoted to the rank of field marshal but the Allies would not accept anything but an unconditional surrender and threatened to resume their attacks, which had been halted the day before. At 12:20 hours Messe gave the orders. He and the remaining German commander, Kurt von Liebenstein, surrendered late in the day. By the close of the operation, nearly 240,000 German and Italian troops had been captured.

See also

 North African campaign timeline

References

Citations

Bibliography

 
 
 

Tunisian campaign
May 1943 events
1943 in Tunisia
1943 in military history